Crepidogastrinus kochi is a species of beetle in the family Carabidae, the only species in the genus Crepidogastrinus.

References

Brachininae